Hoser or hose-head is a slang term originating in Canada that is used to reference or imitate Canadians.

The term "hoser", long used by Canadians, is a comedic label given to someone that gained popularity and notoriety from the comedic skits by Rick Moranis and Dave Thomas (playing the characters of Bob and Doug McKenzie) in SCTV's "The Great White North" segments. The characters also used the verb 'to hose' as a synonym for 'to swindle'.

Origins
The origin of the term is unclear. The Oxford English Dictionary records the first use in writing as being a 1981 Toronto Star article about the McKenzie brothers, and there is no clear evidence that the term was in use before then. Nonetheless, the term has spawned several popular false etymologies.

A popular origin story holds that in outdoor ice hockey before ice resurfacers, the losing team in a hockey game would have to hose down the rink after a game to make the ice smooth again. Thus the term hoser was synonymous with loser. Another suggestion for the origin of the term involves farmers of the Canadian Prairies who would siphon gasoline from farming vehicles with a hose during the Great Depression of the 1930s. "Hosed" is also a euphemism for drunkenness in Canadian English, and by extension a hoser is one who is drunk.

Another possible origin may stem from loggers' slang, where "hoosier" referred contemptuously to an untrained, inept, or slack worker.

The term hoser was used frequently on the U.S. sitcom How I Met Your Mother in relation to main character Robin Scherbatsky, who was a native of Canada. She sometimes visited a Canadian-themed bar, Hoser Hut.

See also
 Canadian slang
 Eh
 List of ethnic slurs
 Strange Brew
 Yoga Hosers

References

Bob and Doug McKenzie
Canadian slang
Stereotypes of white people
Pejorative terms for white people